was a Japanese businessman, central banker and the 10th Governor of the Bank of Japan (BOJ).

Early life
Ichiki was born in Kagoshima Prefecture.

Career
In 1922-1923, Ichiki was briefly Finance Minister in the cabinet of Katō Tomosaburō.  As head of the Ministry of Finance, he was cautious in response to unsettled financial situation.  Ichiki was Governor of the Bank of Japan from September 5, 1923 through May 10, 1927.

Notes

References
 Metzler, Mark. (2006). Lever of Empire: the International Gold Standard and the Crisis of Liberalism in Prewar Japan. Berkeley: University of California Press. ;  OCLC 469841628

1872 births
1954 deaths
Ministers of Finance of Japan
Governors of the Bank of Japan
People from Kagoshima Prefecture
Japanese bankers